Araguaia is a Brazilian supernatural telenovela that debuted on TV Globo from September 27, 2010 to April 8, 2011. It is created by Walther Negrão. It is written by Walther Negrão, Jackie Vellego,
Renato Modesto, Julio Fischer, Alessandro Marson and Fausto Galvão. The novela was topbilled by Cléo Pires, Murilo Rosa, Milena Toscano, Thiago Fragoso, Júlia Lemmertz, Lima Duarte and together with an ensemble cast. Due to its success it was nominated for the International Emmy Awards 2011.

Plot

First phase
In 1845, before industrialization, women had to do everything to protect what they owned as they did not depend so much in men. One day an indigenous tribe, Karuê, launched an attack on the women's homestead and rob and grab their properties. Many are killed and Apoena, one of the attackers rescues Antonîa, a teenager and decides to take her to his community. Through the ventures, Antonîa and Apoena fall in love in and hence, she becomes pregnant. On arriving among the Karuê community, Antonîa's state (pregnancy) awakens Larú's hatred and therefore casts a curse on all Antonîa and Apoena's male offspring. They children die under mysterious circumstances on the banks of Araguaia river.

Second phase
In the 21st century, Fernando (Edson Celulari) receives the news that his mother Antoninha (Regina Duarte) is critically ill and nearing death. He sets a journey back to Araguaia together with his wife, son and her adoptive mother; Estela, Solano and Mariquita respectively. On arrival Antonîa dies after begging Fernando to take away his son away from Araguaia as the curse inflected by Larú is still effective. With the outgoing nature of Fernando he decides to sell Solano's horse in order to find money to take Estela and he back to Rio de Janeiro. He unfortunately dies on the eve of their supposed journey. Estela develops feelings for Solano while Solano has an irresistible attraction to Estela. A love story between Estela (Cleo Pires) a Karuê last female descendant and Solano (Murilo Rosa), the last descendant of Apoena and Antonia. This will put Estela on a quest of fulfilling the curse or living her own love story. The situation complicates when she becomes pregnant with Solano's son who is also affected by the curse. They must fight against all odds in order to get rid of the curse.

Cast

Awards and nominations

Notes

References

External links
 
 Website

2010 Brazilian television series debuts
2011 Brazilian television series endings
2010 telenovelas
TV Globo telenovelas
Brazilian telenovelas
Portuguese-language telenovelas